Tipajasa (possibly from Quechua t'ipa a little basket, q'asa mountain pass, "basket pass") is a mountain in the Vilcanota mountain range in the Andes of Peru, about  high. It is situated in the Puno Region, Carabaya Province, Ollachea District. Tipajasa lies northwest of Tocra and north of  Macho Ritti.

References

Mountains of Peru
Mountains of Puno Region